Sipacate is a resort town and municipality on the Pacific coast of Guatemala, in Escuintla Department about  west of Puerto San José. It is promoted as a venue for surfing. Being roughly in the center of the Guatemalan coastline, it is used as a breakpoint for storm warnings. The Sipicate-Naranjo National Park is located east of the town.
The municipality was formerly a part of La Gomera Municipality just north of Sipacate.

Archaeology
Some very early human settlements are documented in Sipacate, connected with early agriculture.

In sum, sediments sampled in the Sipacate locality appear to document two distinct waves of deforestation associated with early horticulture. The earliest began shortly after 3500 cal B.C. and involved multiple episodes of forest clearance over the next 800 years. The second began after 1700 cal B.C. and coincides with the archaeologically documented presence of Early Formative populations.

Climate

Sipacate has tropical climate (Köppen: Aw).

Geographic location

Sipacate is surrounded by Escuintla Departament municipalities and by the Pacific Ocean.

Notable people
 Tránsito Montepeque - Guatemalan international football player

References

Populated places in Guatemala
Early agriculture in Mesoamerica